Kerachi (also Romanized as Kerāchī; also known as Kerāch and Kerāj) is a village in Kuh Mareh Sorkhi Rural District, Arzhan District, Shiraz County, Fars Province, Iran. At the 2006 census, its population was 216, in 51 families.

References 

Populated places in Shiraz County